Manta Canton is a canton of Ecuador, located in the Manabí Province.  Its capital is the city of Manta.  Its population at the 2001 census was 192,322.

Demographics
Ethnic groups as of the Ecuadorian census of 2010:
Mestizo  76.4%
White  7.8%
Afro-Ecuadorian  7.8%
Montubio  7.2%
Indigenous  0.2%
Other  0.6%

See also
Liguiqui

References

Cantons of Manabí Province